Anacleto Sima Ngua (2 June 1936 – 1 July 2018) was an Equatoguinean Roman Catholic bishop.

Sima Ngua was  born in Equatorial Guinea and was ordained to the priesthood in 1962. Sima Ngua served as bishop of the Roman Catholic Diocese of Bata, Equatorial Guinea, from 1983 to 2002.

Notes

1936 births
2018 deaths
Equatoguinean Roman Catholic bishops
Equatoguinean Roman Catholics
Roman Catholic bishops of Bata